Martti Nõmme (born 7 August 1993) is an Estonian ski jumper. He was born in Võru.

He competed in the 2015 World Cup season.

He competed at the FIS Nordic World Ski Championships 2013 in Val di Fiemme, and represented Estonia at the FIS Nordic World Ski Championships 2015 in Falun.

He represented Estonia at the 2018 Winter Olympics.

References

External links 
 
 

1993 births
Living people
Sportspeople from Võru
Estonian male ski jumpers
Olympic ski jumpers of Estonia
Ski jumpers at the 2018 Winter Olympics